Iridium 7 was a U.S. Iridium communications satellite. It was launched into low Earth orbit from Vandenberg Air Force Base at 14:55 GMT on 5 May 1997, by a Delta II 7920-10C carrier rocket. It was operated in Plane 4 of the Iridium satellite constellation, with an ascending node of 262.4°.

It had a partial technical failure in 2009 and was subsequently paired with Iridium 51, and relegated to following it and managing traffic routing.

See also

 1997 in spaceflight

References

Communications satellites in low Earth orbit
Spacecraft launched in 1997
Iridium satellites